Telok Bahang is a state constituency in Penang, Malaysia, that has been represented in the Penang State Legislative Assembly since 1974. It covers the northwestern corner of Penang Island, including the town of Teluk Bahang.

The state constituency was first contested in 1974 and is mandated to return a single Assemblyman to the Penang State Legislative Assembly under the first-past-the-post voting system. , the State Assemblyman for Telok Bahang is Zolkifly Md Lazim from the Malaysian United Indigenous Party (PPBM), which is part of the state's opposition coalition, Perikatan Nasional (PN).

Definition

Polling districts 
According to the federal gazette issued on 30 March 2018, the Telok Bahang constituency is divided into 7 polling districts.

It encompasses the entire northwestern corner of Penang Island, including the eponymous town of Teluk Bahang near the island's northwestern tip, and much of the sparsely-populated rural west coast of Penang Island.

Demographics

History

Election results 
The electoral results for the Telok Bahang state constituency in 2008, 2013 and 2018 are as follows.

See also 
 Constituencies of Penang

References 

Penang state constituencies